Malaysian Indian United Party (abbrev: MIUP) is a political party representing the Indian community in Malaysia. MIUP was founded and registered on 14 September 2007 and was launched on 25 November 2007 by Nallakaruppan Solaimalai or K.S. Nallakaruppan, who is better known as Anwar Ibrahim's 'tennis partner' after his resignation from Parti Keadilan Rakyat (PKR) because of his fallout with Anwar regarding the candidacy for the Ijok by-election, 2007.

MIUP supports and maintains friendly relations to the then governing Barisan Nasional (BN) although it is not an official member of the coalition but seeks to be admitted into the coalition.

Elected representatives

Dewan Negara (Senate)

Senators

General election results

See also
Politics of Malaysia
List of political parties in Malaysia

References

External links
Official website

Political parties in Malaysia
Political parties established in 2007
2007 establishments in Malaysia
Indian-Malaysian culture
Political parties of minorities